2022–23 Hero I-League 2 is the 15th season of the I-League 2 since its establishment in 2008. This is the first season of I-League 2 since its rebranding as the third tier of Indian football league system. The top two teams on the league table will secure place in the 2023–24 I-League season. The league's group stage has been played from March to May 2023, parallel to the remaining part of both I-League and Indian Super League seasons.

On 27 September 2022, the league committee meeting was held, presided by Lalnghinglova Hmar, and it was initially decided that a total of 15 teams will participate in the upcoming season, including the reserve sides of ISL and I-League. The final phase of the league will be played on home and away basis.

However, on 16 December, the league committee decided that 20 teams will play in I-League 2, consisting of 12 state league champions along with 6 ISL reserve sides and 2 qualification tournament winners.

League committee on 13 January decided that 2 clubs will be promoted to I-League, and 2 relegated clubs along with remaining 3 final round clubs, will directly qualify for the final round of next season.

Changes from last season
 The league will have state league champions or other eligible teams nominated by their respective state football associations, besides the 6 reserve teams of the Indian Super League.

 The reserve teams won't be eligible for promotion.

 Teams will be divided into zones to minimize the travel, and the winners from each zone will qualify for the final phase.

 The final round will be played on a home and away basis, consisting of 5 teams.

 The two among five teams who finish at the top of the table after the final phase will be promoted to the l-League.

 The two relegated I-League teams and other 3 final phase teams will directly qualify for I-league 2 final phase next season.

 Mandatory club licensing criteria is removed for participating in the league.

Qualification

Selection criteria
 State association can nominate the state league champions or other clubs based on the conducted state leagues in the previous season.
 State association can also nominate other clubs in absence of state league, for the qualifier tournament.
 Nominated institutional clubs are ineligible for participation in the league.

Teams selection through state leagues

As per AIFF, teams will be selected to participate in I-League 2 through state leagues nominations. Only the top qualified team can be nominated from the state league.

Reserve teams
The reserve teams of the 6 Indian Super League clubs will participate. However, they would not be eligible for promotion.

Qualification tournament
The states that did not conducted their leagues in the previous season nominated respective clubs to participate in the qualification tournament. The top 2 teams gained qualification for the I-league 2.

Qualifier group

Clubs

Stadiums and locations

Personnel and kits

Group stage 
6 Indian Super League reserve sides will play in this round, along with 12 state champions and 2 state qualification tournament winners.

20 teams will be divided into the 4 groups of 5. Each group winner along with one second best will qualify for the final round.

Group A

Matches

Group B

Group C

Matches

Group D

Ranking of second-placed teams
Since Group B has lesser number of teams, the result against fifth placed teams in other groups will not be counted for the table ranking below.

Final round
5 teams from the group stage will play each other in the Final round, as a single-leg format. Top 2 teams are gaining qualification to the I-league.

Season statistics

Top scorers 

As of 19 March 2023

Clean sheets 

As of 19 March 2023

Discipline

Player 
 Most yellow cards: 0

 Most red cards: 0

Club 
 Most yellow cards: 0

 Most red cards: 0

See also
2022–23 Indian Super League
2022–23 I-League
2022–23 Elite Youth League
2023 RF Development League

References

External links 
I-League
AIFF

I-League 2nd Division seasons
2022–23 in Indian football leagues